Dan Holowaychuk (born September 22, 1962) is a Canadian curler from St. Albert, Alberta.

He is a three-time  and a four-time Tim Hortons Brier champion as the alternate on the legendary "Ferbey Four" team.

As of 2002, he was employed as a business development manager. Earlier in his career he was a salesman for Catelli pasta.

Teams

References

External links
 
 
 Dan Holowaychuk – Curling Canada Stats Archive
 
 
 Moonwake Team 

Living people
1962 births
Canadian male curlers
Curlers from Alberta
World curling champions
Brier champions
Sportspeople from St. Albert, Alberta
20th-century Canadian people